Immaculata High School was an all-girls Catholic high school located in the Lakeview neighborhood of Chicago, Illinois. It was open from 1921 to 1981.

The building was listed on the U.S. National Register of Historic Places in 1977.

The campus buildings received Chicago Landmark status on July 27, 1983. Still standing at Irving Park Road and Marine Drive, they were designed by Prairie School architect Barry Byrne, a onetime apprentice of Frank Lloyd Wright.  The sculpture of Mary above the entrance, now removed, was the work of frequent Byrne collaborator Alfonso Iannelli.

The Immaculata High School records are currently housed at the Women and Leadership Archives.

References

External links

 Immaculata Alumnae Association

School buildings completed in 1921
1921 establishments in Illinois
Educational institutions established in 1921
Chicago Landmarks
Former high schools in Illinois
School buildings on the National Register of Historic Places in Chicago
Private high schools in Chicago
Defunct Catholic secondary schools in Illinois
Defunct private schools in Chicago
Educational institutions disestablished in 1981